Port Browning, British Columbia, Canada is formed between North and South Pender Islands in the British Columbia Gulf Islands. There is a government dock and commercial marina at the head of the inlet. From Port Browning, Pender Canal leads to Bedwell Harbour. Port Browning also leads eastward to Plumper Sound.

References

www.portbrowning.com
The Resettlement of British Columbia: Essays on Colonialism and Geographical,  By Cole Harris, page 179

External links
facebook.com Port Browning

Ports and harbours of British Columbia